Anette Gersch (born 26 February 1966, in Sonthofen) is a German former alpine skier who competed in the 1988 Winter Olympics.

External links
 sports-reference.com
 

1966 births
Living people
Olympic alpine skiers of West Germany
Alpine skiers at the 1988 Winter Olympics
People from Sonthofen
Sportspeople from Swabia (Bavaria)
German female alpine skiers
20th-century German women